"Concerning the Jews" is an 1899 short essay by Mark Twain. Twain had lived in Austria during 1896, and opined that the Habsburg empire used Jews as scapegoats to maintain unity in their immensely diverse empire.

Background
In 1898 he published the article "Stirring Times in Austria". Twain's account generated several letters, and one poignant response in particular from an American Jewish lawyer who asked Twain: "Tell me, therefore, from your vantage-point of cold view, what in your mind is the cause. Can American Jews do anything to correct it either in America or abroad? Will it ever come to an end? Will a Jew be permitted to live honestly, decently, and peaceably like the rest of mankind? What has become of the golden rule?" In response, Twain penned "Concerning the Jews," which Harper's also published in 1899.

Contents

The essay included the statement that Jews did not do their part in terms of fighting in America's armed forces: "He is a frequent and faithful and capable officer in the civil service, but he is charged with an unpatriotic disinclination to stand by the flag as a soldier – like the Christian Quaker." However, when War Department figures revealed that Jewish Americans were actually represented in the nation's military in a larger percentage than their share of the population, Twain issued a retraction and an apology, entitled Postscript – The Jew as Soldier.

The essay also included a positive account of the Jewish people, with regard to their survival:

Reception
Israeli scholar Bennet Kravitz states that one could just as easily hate Jews for the reasons Twain gives for admiring them. In fact, Twain's essay was cited by Nazi sympathizers in the 1930s. Kravitz concludes, "The flawed logic of 'Concerning the Jews' and all philo-Semitism leads to the anti-Semitic beliefs that the latter seeks to deflate".

See also
Philo-Semitism

References

External links

"Concerning the Jews", Harper's Magazine, September 1899, pp. 527–535 [facsimile].
"Concerning the Jews"

Essays by Mark Twain
1899 essays
Philosemitism
Works originally published in Harper's Magazine
Works about Jews and Judaism